Franco Alves de Souza, known as Franco (born 24 September 1987) is a Brazilian professional footballer .

In 2006, he was playing with Tombense Futebol Clube in the Campeonato Mineiro.  He played with FK Sevojno in Serbia and FK Pobeda in Macedonia.  In 2014, he joined Jordanian club Al-Jazeera (Amman).

References

Living people
1987 births
Footballers from Rio de Janeiro (city)
Brazilian footballers
Brazilian expatriate footballers
Tombense Futebol Clube players
FK Sevojno players
Serbian First League players
Expatriate footballers in Serbia
FK Pobeda players
Masfout Club players
Al-Jazeera (Jordan) players
UAE First Division League players
Expatriate footballers in North Macedonia
Brazilian expatriate sportspeople in North Macedonia
Brazilian expatriate sportspeople in Serbia
Association football midfielders
Expatriate footballers in Jordan
Expatriate footballers in the United Arab Emirates
Brazilian expatriate sportspeople in the United Arab Emirates